The 2021 Spanish motorcycle Grand Prix (officially known as the Gran Premio Red Bull de España) was the fourth round of the 2021 Grand Prix motorcycle racing season and the first round of the 2021 MotoE World Cup. It was held at the Circuito de Jerez-Ángel Nieto in Jerez de la Frontera on 2 May 2021.

MotoGP Championship standings before the race 
After winning the Portuguese motorcycle Grand Prix, Fabio Quartararo leads the rider standings with 61 points, 15 more than Francesco Bagnaia. Maverick Viñales is third with 41 points, followed by Johann Zarco and Joan Mir, respectively on 40 and 38 points.

In the constructors' standings, Yamaha has full points with 75 points, followed by Ducati with 60 points and Suzuki with 42 points. Aprilia, KTM and Honda are enclosed in 5 points (25, 22 and 20).

In the team championship standings, Monster Energy Yamaha is first with 102 points, followed by Team Suzuki Ecstar, Ducati Lenovo Team and Pramac Racing respectively 41, 42 and 45 points behind. Aprilia Racing Team Gresini is fifth with 27 points.

Qualifying

MotoGP

Race

MotoGP

Moto2

 Jake Dixon suffered a concussion in a crash during warm-up session and was declared unfit to start the race.

Moto3

MotoE

All bikes manufactured by Energica.

Championship standings after the race
Below are the standings for the top five riders, constructors, and teams after the round.

MotoGP

Riders' Championship standings

Constructors' Championship standings

Teams' Championship standings

Moto2

Riders' Championship standings

Constructors' Championship standings

Teams' Championship standings

Moto3

Riders' Championship standings

Constructors' Championship standings

Teams' Championship standings

MotoE

Notes

References

External links

Spanish
Motorcycle Grand Prix
Motorcycle Grand Prix
Spanish motorcycle Grand Prix